The Hawk's Nest is a scenic location outside Port Jervis, New York high above the Delaware River on New York State Route 97. Its name is derived from the birds of prey that nest in the area. The location is also known for its winding roads and scenic overlooks in the Delaware River Valley.

Route 97 was originally a one-lane dirt road built in 1859. It was paved between 1931–1933 and subsequently dedicated in 1939, and rededicated on September 21, 2002, as part of the "Upper Delaware Scenic Byway" (according to a historical marker placed by the Town of Deerpark, where Hawk's Nest is located).

History
In the summer of 1874, the citizens of  Monagaup sought to have a direct route over the mountains into the Bolton Basin (Sparrowbush area). The existing route went up the Mongaup River to near Bush Kill Creek with a trail to the Old Plank Road, which led down into Bolton Basin. The proposed route would eliminate  from the trip. In the spring of 1876, 124 men from Sparrowbush were hired at $1.00 a day to complete the work. Within a week the first vehicle driven by H.H. Parnum traversed the construction site.

The New York State Highway System was expanded in 1911 under the Evans Delaware River Road Bill, adding the Port Jervis-Sullivan County-Hancock highway as Route 3-A.  Later that year the road was widened to two lanes with the addition of stonewalls and guard rails.

Gallery

References
Notes

External links

Geography of Orange County, New York
Tourist attractions in Orange County, New York